Gavin Edwards may refer to:
 Gavin Edwards (cricketer) (born 1979), English cricketer
 Gavin Edwards (writer), American writer
 Gavin Edwards (basketball) (born 1988), American basketball player
 Gavin Edwards (politician), South African politician